The Maryland State Police (MSP), officially the Maryland Department of State Police (MDSP), is the official state police force of the U.S. state of Maryland. The Maryland State Police is headquartered at 1201 Reisterstown Road in the Pikesville CDP in unincorporated Baltimore County.

Organizational structure
The Maryland State Police is organized into a structure based on the United States military, composed of:

Department of State Police (commanded by the Colonel)
Bureaus (commanded by a Lieutenant Colonel)
Commands (commanded by a Major)
Troops (commanded by a Captain)
Divisions (commanded by a Captain or Civilian Director)
Barracks (commanded by a Lieutenant)
Sections (commanded by a Captain or Lieutenant or Civilian Director)
Units (commanded by a First Sergeant)

The Maryland State Fire Marshal is a member of the department and is charged with investigation and prosecution of suspicious fires and arson throughout the state.

All sworn members are organized into 1 of 4 bureaus or are assigned to the Office of the Superintendent.

Office of the Superintendent
The Office of the Superintendent includes staff and units that directly support the administrative responsibilities of the Secretary.  Those units and staff report to the chief of staff.  Some of the main functions of the Office of the Superintendent include:

Strategic Planning Command
The Strategic Planning Command deals with all planning within the department.  The command manages the Budget and Finance Division, Government Affairs Unit, Policing Division, Staff Inspections Section, and Planning and Research Division.  Within the Planning and Research Division is the Property Unit and the Accreditation Section.  The Accreditation Section is responsible for authoring, review and issuance of all departmental directives. In addition, this section manages all aspects of the MSP's CALEA accreditation.  The MSP received CALEA's coveted Tri-Arc award  in November 2014 and is accredited in Law Enforcement, Training Academy, and Communications.

Criminal Intelligence Section
The section collects, analyzes, and coordinates the acquisition and dissemination of criminal intelligence information.

Department Prosecutor Section
The section has overall responsibility for the prosecution of all sworn disciplinary cases.

Executive Protection Section
The Executive Protection Section provides security for executive branch leaders in the State of Maryland, such as the Governor, Lieutenant Governor, Attorney General, Comptroller, and Treasurer.

Legislative Security Section
The Legislative Security Section is charged with ensuring the safety and security of the President of the Senate, Speaker of the House, and all members of the General Assembly while in session.

Fair Practices Section
The section is responsible for ensuring compliance with the Governor's Code of Fair Practices; state and federal discrimination laws; and administers an equal employment practices program consistent with the requirements of federal and state laws governing equal employment opportunity and the State Personnel and Pensions Article.

Internal Affairs Division
The section ensures thorough and objective investigations of allegations and complaints of misconduct against employees so that a proper defensive or appropriate disciplinary actions is processed.

Legal Counsel Section
The legal advisor represents the superintendent on legal issues and handles all matters referred by the superintendent.

Office of Media Communications
The office is responsible for the daily dissemination of information to the media and public, and the facilitation of internal communication from the Office of the Superintendent.

Vehicle Theft Prevention Council
Subtitle 2-702 of the Public Safety Article established the Vehicle Theft Prevention Council and Vehicle Theft Prevention Fund to assist in the prevention and deterrence of vehicle theft and related crimes, including vandalism and theft of property from vehicles.

Field Operations Bureau
The Field Operations Bureau is the most visible part of the Maryland State Police since it includes all troopers who regularly interact with the public. Within the Bureau are two commands: the Northern Command and Southern Command which together encompass the 22 barracks.  The Northern Command is divided into the Central, Northern, and Western troops and the Southern Command is divided into the Eastern, Southern, and Washington Metro troops.
In addition to the traditional law enforcement services, each Barrack also provides additional services to assist the public. These services include salvage inspections and car seat safety checks.

The Automotive Safety Enforcement Division is responsible, by law, for the State's vehicle safety inspection program and all safety equipment repair orders issued by law enforcement agencies.  The Division also supervises more than 1,600 inspection stations throughout the State.
The Commercial Vehicle Enforcement Division operates weigh and inspection stations.  It also focuses efforts on safety inspections of commercial motor vehicles traveling in the State, while also concentrating on the prevention of commercial vehicles being used as weapons of terror.  The Special Operations Division includes many specialized units and teams which provide safety and rescue assistance to the citizens of Maryland.

The Field Operations Bureau is currently commanded by Lieutenant Colonel Frank B. Lioi, Chief.

State Police Impaired Driving Reduction Effort
A component of the Field Operations Bureau, SPIDRE was launched in May 2013 and focuses on reducing alcohol related crashes in Maryland by targeting areas across the state with high crash rates involving impaired drivers.  The program complements the MSP's extensive efforts to improve highway safety and help Maryland achieve the goal of zero deaths on our roadways.  It is funded by the Maryland Department of Transportation's Highway Safety Office.
In 2013, 152 people were killed in alcohol related crashes, accounting for 33 percent of all traffic fatalities in 2013.  Using data to identify high risk areas, the elite team of seven specially trained Maryland state troopers and their partners continue to make arrests in these concentrated areas to further reduce the number of deaths and injuries caused by impaired driving.  Maryland state troopers will continue to collaborate with law enforcement partners in an effort to reduce the number of alcohol related crashes in Maryland.

Criminal Investigation Bureau
The Criminal Investigation Bureau provides the investigative functions for the Department in partnership with allied law enforcement agencies.  It consists of the Criminal Investigation Command and the Drug Enforcement Command.  The Criminal Investigation Command includes the Criminal Enforcement Division and the Forensic Sciences Division.

The Criminal Enforcement Division is composed of special investigative groups that work on criminal enforcement, gang and firearms enforcement, computer crimes, missing children, homicides, fugitive apprehension, vehicle theft, insurance fraud and environmental crimes.  The Forensic Sciences Division provides forensic laboratory analysis and expert testimony.

The Drug Enforcement Command includes the Drug Enforcement Division.  Their responsibility is to lead the Maryland State Police drug control strategy by focusing on the disruption of drug trafficking at every level.  Through a variety of investigative techniques, personnel attempt to identify, infiltrate, and dismantle drug organizations operating in Maryland.  The bureau underwent a realignment in 2013.  Barrack investigators were placed into regional commands scattered geographically throughout the state.  Investigators assist allied agencies with both minor and major investigations.  A primary focus of the bureau are those crimes having an inter-jurisdictional nexus (crimes which cross local, county, or state borders).
The Criminal Investigation Bureau is currently commanded by Lieutenant Colonel David L. Ruel, Chief.

Support Services Bureau
The Support Services Bureau is divided into three commands: Logistics, Personnel, and Technology and Information Management.  It provides materials and services to the Department of State Police and allied law enforcement agencies to enable them to meet their obligations and responsibilities. The Bureau's responsibilities also include managing the Department's information technology and communications systems.

The Aviation Command transports critically injured citizens to trauma centers.  The Command also provides aerial support for the Department and allied public safety agencies, conducts search and rescue operations, and aids in criminal investigation and traffic control.

The Support Services Bureau is currently commanded by Lieutenant Colonel Dalaine M. Brady

Aviation Command

The agency operates a large Aviation Command focusing on medevac operations. Aviation also supports ground units of the state and local police. Funding comes from a vehicle registration surcharge ($17.00 per vehicle per year as of 2015) collected by the Maryland Motor Vehicle Administration.

Based out of seven strategically located sections, the Aviation Command operates two types of aircraft.  The command operates as a multi-role helicopter unit conducting all scene-based medevac operations in the State of Maryland.  Crews on the helicopter consist of two pilots and two Trooper/Flight Paramedics.  Inter-facility (hospital to hospital) remain the responsibility of private medevac providers.  The only exception is neonatal transports which are still handled by the State Police through an agreement with the Maryland Neonatal Transport Team.

In addition to medevacs, the Aviation Command provides advanced search-and-rescue services and airborne hoisting in emergency situations through the deployment of highly trained crews. The command routinely assists allied law enforcement agencies by providing a robust airborne law enforcement platform through the use of advanced camera and searchlight capabilities.

On October 20, 2010, Maryland State Police awarded a $71 million contract to AgustaWestland to provide six AW139 helicopters. In 2013, the contract totaled 10 AW139s at a price of $121.7 million.

As of December 31, 2014, all seven of the Aviation Command's sections were operational using the new AW139 aircraft.  All 11 of the Eurocopter Dauphins were subsequently retired and sold at auction.

Current Fleet (As of May 10, 2020):

AW139 Fleet Data:

Retired Fleet:

Dauphin Fleet Data:

JetRanger Fleet Data (Incomplete Fleet Information):

The Aviation Command was instrumental in the support of the first trauma center in the USA, the R Adams Cowley Shock Trauma Center at the University of Maryland Medical Center in Baltimore.

History
Until 1921, Maryland had no state-wide police force. In that year, in response to increasing crime, the Commissioner of Motor Vehicles organized a team of police officers who were given statewide jurisdiction to enforce traffic and criminal laws. They gained jurisdiction through deputization by county sheriffs. An associated plainclothes investigative unit became known as the "State Police Force."

In 1935, the Maryland State Police was established as a separate unit of state government, funded out of revenues from the Department of Commissioner of Motor Vehicles. It was granted additional statewide police powers to enforce fish, oyster, game and other conservation laws and maintain a training school. It was made part of the Department of Public Safety and Correctional Services in 1970.

In 1994, the Department of Maryland State Police was formed as a separate executive department; it was renamed the Department of State Police in 1995. Recent superintendents have included David B. Mitchell from 1995 to 2003, Ed Norris from 2003 to 2004, Thomas E. Hutchins from 2004 to 2007, Terrence Sheridan from 2007 to 2011 and Marcus L. Brown from 2011 to 2015.

Colonel William M. Pallozzi was appointed as the acting superintendent on February 17, 2015.  Colonel Pallozzi was overwhelmingly confirmed by the Maryland Legislature and on March 26, 2015, was officially sworn in as Maryland State Police Superintendent.  Colonel Pallozzi began his career as a patrol trooper with the Maryland State Police in 1989. Since that time, he has held various supervisory and leadership positions, including commander of the Executive Protection Division; chief of staff in the Office of the Superintendent; chief of the Criminal Investigation Bureau; and chief of the Support Services Bureau. In his last role, he oversaw multiple, complex projects and programs impacting every aspect of the Maryland State Police.

In the history of the force, forty-three state troopers have been killed in the line of duty.

Jurisdiction
The Maryland State Police has jurisdiction throughout Maryland and may, in its discretion or at the request of any municipal agency, or when ordered by the Governor of Maryland, exercise and enforce statewide laws without regard to jurisdiction within the boundaries of the state of Maryland. Otherwise, except under certain conditions as defined by statute, the agency does not enforce criminal laws within the jurisdiction of those incorporated municipalities which have their own police force.

The department also has the authority and jurisdiction to investigate allegations of police corruption concerning any municipal agency within the state. The department also enforces controlled substance laws throughout the state.

Uniform and equipment
The police uniform has remained the same since 1951.  The standard uniform consists of olive pants with a black stripe down the side,  a tan colored button-up shirt is worn, with long sleeves in winter and short sleeves in summer.  A black tie is worn with the long-sleeve shirt. Some also wear black sweaters in cold weather. Class A uniforms consist of a dress blouse and Sam Browne belt. The ranks of trooper first class, corporal, sergeant, and first sergeant wear yellow chevrons showing their rank on both sleeves. Members of certain specialized units wear a military camouflage work uniform.

A felt Stetson hat is worn in the winter months with a long sleeve shirt and tie, and a straw Stetson is worn in the summer months with the short sleeve shirt.

Maryland State Police troopers are issued the Glock 22 chambered in 40 S&W, replacing the Beretta Px4 Storm and a Remington 870 shotgun.  Qualified troopers are also issued the Colt M16-A1 or the Colt AR-15 semi-automatic rifles.

Vehicles
Troopers patrol in marked or unmarked vehicles.  Early marked patrol units were olive green with black fenders.  Beginning in 1972, vehicles (including helicopters) were painted yellow.  Beginning in about 1984 new vehicles were painted tan with black and olive side stripes from front to rear.  In approximately 1996, the agency changed back to the historic colors, and painted vehicles with most horizontal surfaces olive green and most vertical surfaces black.

MSP currently operates a fleet consisting of the Ford Police Interceptor Utility, Ford Police Interceptor Sedan, Chevrolet Caprice 9C1, and Chevrolet Tahoe PPV, with the Ford Crown Victoria Police Interceptor being phased out of service.  Most newer vehicles are painted in the traditional green over black paint schemes, however, some are painted all black with traditional MSP lettering.  All marked patrol vehicles contain the Maryland State Police Shield on both the driver and passenger door as well as "State Trooper" decals on the fenders and rear of the vehicle.  Trooper's vehicles are not equipped with prisoner cages. Prisoners, by policy, are transported in the front seat.

Most vehicles assigned to patrol functions are equipped with mounted radar units, in-car mobile data terminals, printers, and barcode scanners that allow troopers to access various law enforcement databases as well as provide the hardware support for the MSP's Etix electronic citation program.  This setup enables troopers to spend more time on patrol as they are able to complete reports through an internet-based computer-aided dispatch / report management system.

Training
The Maryland State Police Training Academy is in Sykesville, Maryland, along with the Maryland Police and Correctional Training Commission. The academy is live-in and consists of twenty-six weeks of basic instruction.

Candidates take college-level academic classes for which they receive 45 college credits. Training includes instruction in the use of the agency's firearms as well as in criminal law, motor vehicle law and emergency vehicle operation. Vehicle training is conducted on the training commission's course.

Upon completion of training, troopers are assigned to one of twenty-three barracks located around Maryland. There troopers will complete an additional eight weeks of field training under the supervision of a Field Training Trooper (FTT).

Barracks

Rank structure
The Maryland State Police is a paramilitary organization with a rank structure modeled after the United States military. The ranks of corporal through captain are based on promotional testing; majors and above are appointed by the superintendent.

The Maryland State Police rank structure is as listed:

Demographics
Male: 90%
Female: 10%
White: 78%
African-American/Black: 15%
Hispanic: 2%
Asian: 1%

Specialized units
Homeland Security and Intelligence Division (HSID)
Criminal Enforcement Division (CED)
Executive Protection
S.T.A.T.E. Team (SWAT)
Aviation Command
D.A.R.E.
Accident Reconstruction
Canine Unit (K9)
Crime Lab
Media Communications
Computer Crimes
Automotive Safety Enforcement Division
Police Academy or Training Division
Motorcycle Unit–Troopers from the Motorcycle Unit also patrol on All-Terrain Vehicles.
Licensing Division
Commercial Vehicle Enforcement Division
Underwater Recovery Unit (MSP URT)

Trooper 2 crash
On September 28, 2008, around 12:00am, Trooper 2 (Eurocopter AS 365N1 Dauphin, N92MD) crashed with five people aboard in Walker Mill Regional Park in Prince George's County.  Out of the five aboard, there were four confirmed fatalities, which included pilot Stephen H. Bunker (retired corporal), paramedic Trooper First Class Mickey C. Lippy, Emergency Medical Technician Tonya Mallard (Waldorf Volunteer Fire Department), and one of the two patients on board.  This resulted in the grounding of all aircraft, until the cause was determined, with allied agencies covering the state. Aircraft were inspected and brought up to cover missions two weeks after the crash with no resulting incidents.

This is the fourth fatal crash in the history of the Aviation Division.  The most recent fatal crash prior to this occurred on January 19, 1986.

Controversies

Former superintendents (secretaries) of state police
Col. Edward T. Norris (Secretary of State Police 2003) pled guilty to federal corruption and tax charges. Federal prosecutors said he used the money, in part, to pay for extramarital encounters with six women. He served 6 months in federal prison, followed by three years of supervised probation and was ordered to perform 500 hours of community service.

Col. Marcus L. Brown (Secretary of State Police 2011-2015) after leaving the Maryland State Police, was appointed acting head of the Pennsylvania State Police by Pennsylvania Governor Tom Wolf. Brown became the subject of a Hampden Township, PA Police misdemeanor theft investigation after Brown was caught on video attempting to remove opponents' political signs.  Many Republican senators expressed concern, "the incident calls into question Brown's judgment and ability to handle controversy and difficult situations within the bounds of the law."

Brown apologized, admitting, he "made a mistake in judgment", adding his actions didn't reflect well on himself or the state police. Brown lost his appointment for commissioner of the Pennsylvania State Police confirmation vote, mostly along party lines, and subsequently withdrew his name from consideration.  Gov. Tom Wolf recalled Brown's nomination June 8, 2015, and later appointed him to another position that didn't require confirmation.

Racial profiling
In 1998 several individual plaintiffs, were joined by the NAACP, and the ACLU in filing a federal lawsuit alleging Maryland State Troopers were continuing to engage in racial profiling and discrimination.  In 2003, the Maryland State Police entered into a Consent Decree with the US Department of Justice to resolve major portions of the case.  The consent decree required, among other things; implementation of a policy against racial profiling, audio visual recording of traffic stops and searches, a 24 hour toll free hotline to receive discrimination complaints, and increased training.

In 2008 the State Police finally settled what had become known as the "driving while black" case, by agreeing to pay $300,000 in damages and legal costs, and up to $100,000 to retain an independent consultant to implement policy and practices changes.

Domestic Spying
In 2008, it was revealed through Freedom of Information Act requests that the Maryland State Police had been engaged in domestic spying of anti-war, anti-death penalty and environmental activists, and classified 53 of them as "terrorists," although none of them committed a violent crime. The police admitted that there was never any evidence linking these individuals with any intention to commit any acts of violence. Among those listed as terrorists were two Roman Catholic nuns living in Baltimore.

Search tactics questioned

On the morning of March 11, 2014, officers from the Montgomery County Police Department, Maryland State Police, Rockville  City Police, and Prince George's County Police acting on a tip set up a roadblock on across all 12-lanes on Interstate 270 and walked car to car with pistols, shotguns and semiautomatic rifles searching for three armed bank robbery suspects. The incident brought hundreds of cars and thousands of motorists on the interstate to a standstill for 45-minutes as dozens of police officers conducted vehicle-to-vehicle searches. The search tactics came into question, with reports of officers walking down I-270 between stopped cars with guns drawn, telling people to get back in their vehicles, and open their trunks. One woman was reportedly shouted at by police with weapons drawn after she'd opened her car door to throw up, having gotten carsick from sitting in traffic. MCPD Chief Manger defended the incident. Don Troop, a motorist in the traffic, told the Washington Post that a group of officers made its way to his car and other cars around him. "They were just walking along saying: "Pop the trunk! Pop the trunk!" Troop said he overheard a man in a truck next to him call out to another motorist: "The police are looking for bank robbers." A short time later, about nine officers approached his car — including state police in tan uniforms, county police in dark uniforms and at least one plainclothes officer wearing a yellow tie. Among their commands to motorists that Troop heard: "Stay in your car." "Pop the trunk." "Get your hands on the steering wheel. Get you hands up where we can see them." Cpl. Aaron Smith, a pilot flying a Prince George's County helicopter dispatched to assist stated "We saw that they were searching traffic and going vehicle to vehicle." Montgomery County Police spokesman Captain Paul Starks described the incident as a "systematic check of trunks and rear hitches" of detained vehicles. Three suspects were identified in the traffic and taken into custody without incident. One handgun and bank currency were recovered. No legal action was filed against any police department due to the incident.

See also

 List of law enforcement agencies in Maryland
 State Police (United States)
 State Patrol
 Highway Patrol
 Maryland State Police Museum - Pikesville, Maryland

References

External links
 
 MSP Aviation Command
 Maryland Trooper's Association

State law enforcement agencies of Maryland
Government agencies established in 1921
1921 establishments in Maryland